This is a list of former Christian Science churches, societies, and buildings. Following its early meteoric rise,  the Christian Science Church  suffered a steep decline in membership in the second half of the twentieth century.  Though the Church is prohibited by the Manual of The Mother Church from publishing membership figures, the number of branch churches in the United States has fallen steadily since World War II.  A 1992 study of the Christian Research Journal found that church membership had fallen from 269,000 in the 1930s to about 150,000.  Some believe membership has fallen further since then, however current estimates for church membership vary widely, from under 100,000 to 600,000.

Dr. Stephen Barrett has reported that since 1971, the number of practitioners and teachers listed in the Christian Science Journal has fallen from about 5,000 to about 1,160 and the number of churches has fallen from about 1,800 to about 1,000.

The purpose of this list is to identify and quantify this decline in Christian Science institutions and those related to Christian Science, as well as catalog the buildings and spaces once used by the Christian Science Church.  While it is impossible to get accurate membership figures, it is possible to determine the decline in institutions through official church publications and other sources.

Former buildings in Canada and the United States

Notes:
In the status column Relocated indicates that a church or society sold its building but did not dissolve or merge. Merged indicates that a church or society merged with another one and relocated.
The NRHP column is for National Register of Historic Places or state or local listings with the highest one for a property being indicated as follows: Yes = NRHP; CP = contributing property in an NRHP district, State =state, territorial, etc., listing; Local = county, city, etc. listing; and No = none of these listings.  Country = CAN for Canada or USA for the United States



Canada

Alberta

 Second Church of Christ, Scientist, Calgary, Alberta,  617 7th West; Note: Merged with First Church in 1944.

Manitoba
 Missing from the CS Journal
 First, Brandon, Manitoba, incorporated 1906
 Society, Virden, Manitoba, incorporated as First, 1912
 Second, Winnipeg

Ontario
Toronto, Ontario:
Second Church of Christ, Scientist, 53 Donlands Avenue (now Wilkinson Jr Public School)
Third Church of Christ, Scientist, 70 High Park Avenue (now a condominium tower)
Fourth Church of Christ, Scientist, 245 Beech Avenue (now a residence)  
Sixth Church of Christ, Scientist,  met at the former Royal George Theatre, 1219 St Clair Avenue West

Saskatchewan
 Saskatoon First, 2402 7 St E, building now mixed use commercial, church downgraded to society and meets at #2 1025 Boychuk Dr

United States

Florida
First Church of Christ, Scientist, Fort Pierce, Florida, on January 31, 1996, sold its church edifice at 911 Sunrise Boulevard for $110,000 to The Pentecostal Church of God in America, Florida District, Inc., d/b/a Glad Tidings Pentecostal Church of God, by warranty deed recorded in Official Records Book 997, page 2392, St. Lucie County, Florida, public records, as accessed online September 5, 2007. First Church is no longer in existence.
First Church of Christ Scientist, Holmes Beach, Florida, voluntary dissolution, April 5, 2004
First Church of Christ, Scientist, Lake Worth, Florida, 918 N lakeside Drive, voluntarily dissolved, May 7, 2004 The building is now the Victory Believer's Chapel

Iowa
 First Church of Christ, Scientist (Fort Dodge, Iowa) is now the home of the Hawkeye Community Theatre.
 First Church of Christ, Scientist (Humboldt, Iowa) is now a private residence at 25½ N. 6th Street.

Kansas
 First Church of Christ, Scientist (Wichita, Kansas) is now the Grand Chapel, a nonreligious wedding venue.
 Christian Science Church (Lawrence, Kansas) is now the Cat Clinic (pet supply).

New Jersey
 First Church of Christ, Scientist (Maplewood, New Jersey) is now the Burgdorff Cultural Center and a realtor office.

Utah
 First Church of Christ, Scientist (Provo, Utah) is now the Provo Community Theater.

West Virginia
 First Church of Christ, Scientist (Wheeling, West Virginia), 99 14th Street,  is now the Agape Baptist Church.

Churches and societies that were merged into another church or society
 First Church of Christ, Scientist, Hollywood, Florida, with Christian Science Society (Hollywood, Florida)

Churches that were downgraded to societies

 First Church of Christ, Scientist (Grinnell, Iowa) is now Christian Science Society (Grinnell, Iowa)
 First Church of Christ, Scientist, Hudson, New York, is now Christian Science Society, Hudson, New York.
First Church of Christ, Scientist (Oconto, Wisconsin) on the National Register, is now Christian Science Society, Oconto, Wisconsin.

Churches in transition
 Alvin, Texas, First Church at 713 South Lee Street is listed for sale as vacant as of December 7, 2007. The February 2007 Christian Science Journal listed a Christian Science Society at that address.

Other related institutions and sites
 Camp Sangamon and its sister camp, Camp Betsey Cox, both located in Pittsford, Vermont, were originally run by Christian Scientists for the children of Christian Scientists. Today there are no religious restrictions.
 Christian Science Benevolent Association on the West Coast, was one of 2 BAs operated by the Mother Church.In 1973, it was turned over to a local group of Christian Scientists who continue to operate it as Arden Wood nursing home.
 Daycroft School in Greenwich, Connecticut, closed in 1991.
 Mary Baker Eddy Birthplace Monument, Bow, New Hampshire The large granite monument erected on the site was dynamited by order of the CS Board of Directors.

Former Christian Science churches, societies and buildings in Countries other than Canada and the United States

United Kingdom
The date in the "Deregistered" column is the month and year in which the building's registration for worship in accordance with the Places of Worship Registration Act 1855 was formally cancelled.  If there is no date, the church has not been formally deregistered.

Missing churches in all countries
Note: Following the custom of early New England Congregational and Baptist churches, Churches of Christ, Scientist, in a city or town are numbered First, Second, Third, etc. Societies are not numbered, however. Since all churches and societies are listed in the monthly Christian Science Journal, it is possible to determine the numbers of most but not all missing churches. For example, if a city has listings for only second and fourth churches, it is obvious that first and third are missing. As merged churches take the name of the older congregation, first could then be assumed to have dissolved, while third might have dissolved or merged with second. Fifth may have merged, dissolved, or never existed.

A-B-C
 Berlin, Germany Fourth through Tenth
 Birmingham, England First.
 Chicago, Illinois Fourth, Sixth, Ninth, Tenth, Twelfth through Fifteenth.
 Cleveland, Ohio Second Church.

D-E-F
 Dallas, Texas First, Second, Fourth and Sixth
 Denver, Colorado Second through Fifth
 Duluth, Minnesota Second
 El Paso, Texas  Second
 Evanston, Illinois, First.

G-H-I
 Houston, Texas Second, Third, Fifth and Sixth.
 Indianapolis, Indiana Second.

J-K-L
 Jacksonville, Florida, Third.
 Kansas City, Missouri First through Third, Fifth, Eighth and Ninth.
 Leeds, West Yorkshire, England Second.
 Liverpool, England First and Second.
 London, England, Fourth through Tenth
 Long Beach, California Second and Third.
 Los Angeles, California First, Fourth, Seventh, Eighth, Eleventh, Fifteenth through Nineteenth, Twenty-First through Twenty-Seventh, Twenty-Ninth through Thirty-Fifth, Thirty-Seventh, Thirty-Ninth, Fortieth, Forty-Second and Forty-Third churches.

M-N-O
 Manchester, England First and Third.
 Milwaukee, Wisconsin First and Second.
 Minneapolis, Minnesota Fifth through Sixth.
 New York, New York, includes Manhattan and Bronx: Fourth, Sixth, and Eleventh through Fifteenth
 Oakland, California Second through Ninth.

P-Q-R
 Philadelphia, Pennsylvania Third through Fifth.
 Plainfield, New Jersey First, see Independent or secessionist churches above.
 Portland, Oregon First through Fifth, Seventh and Ninth.
 Pretoria, South Africa First.

S-T-U-V
 Sacramento, California Third and Fourth.
 Saint Louis, Missouri, Second through Fifth and Seventh.
 San Antonio, Texas, Second
 San Diego, California Third and Fifth.
 San Francisco, California Third, Sixth through Eighth and Tenth through Twelfth.
 São Paulo, Brazil, Third
 Seattle, Washington Second, Fourth through Sixth, Eighth, Ninth and Eleventh.
 Thunder Bay, Ontario First
 Tulsa, Oklahoma Second through Fifth.
 Tucson, Arizona Second.
 Vancouver, British Columbia, First and Third

W-X-Y-Z
 Washington, D.C. Second.
 Whittier, California First.  (This church was located at the southeast corner of Bailey Street and Washington Avenue. It is now the Good Shepherd Bible Church.)
 Worthing, West Sussex, England, First.

See also 
 First Church of Christ, Scientist (disambiguation)
 Second Church of Christ, Scientist (disambiguation)
 Fourth Church of Christ, Scientist (disambiguation)

References

Bibliography 

 
 
 
Christian Science, former